Alfonso Aldiverti (early 17th century) was an Italian painter of the early Baroque period, active mainly in Rovigo.

He was born the son of a notary. He painted Scenes from the life of Christ for the church of Santa Maria della Neve, including a  Christ Condemned  (1615). He also painted a St. Charles Borromeo for the church of San Bartolommeo in Rovigo.

He trained under Domenico Stella in Rovigo. His uncle, the priest Fabrizio Aldiverti, was an Inquisitor of the Holy Office (Roman Catholic Inquisition).

References

17th-century Italian painters
Italian male painters
Italian Mannerist painters
Italian Baroque painters
Year of death unknown
Year of birth unknown